MANAS was an eight-page philosophical fortnightly written, edited, and published by Henry Geiger from 1948 until December 1988. Each issue typically contained several short essays that reflected on the human condition, examining in particular environmental and ethical concerns from a global perspective. E. F. Schumacher's influential essay on Buddhist economics was published in the journal.

References

External links
 All issues of Manas available free online
 The Schumacher Society and Manas

Defunct magazines published in the United States
Biweekly magazines published in the United States
Magazines established in 1948
Magazines disestablished in 1988
Philosophy magazines